The women's 10 kilometre classical cross-country skiing competition at the 2014 Sochi Olympics took place on 13 February at Laura Biathlon & Ski Complex. Justyna Kowalczyk of Poland won the race after taking a commanding lead early on, then never threatened. Swede Charlotte Kalla won her second silver medal of the 2014 Olympic Games, and Therese Johaug of Norway edged into third place to win the bronze medal.

Qualification

An athlete with a maximum of 100 FIS distance points (the A standard) will be allowed to compete in both or one of the event (sprint/distance). An athlete with a maximum 120 FIS sprint points will be allowed to compete in the sprint event and 10 km for women or 15 km for men provided their distance points do not exceed 300 FIS points. NOC's who do not have any athlete meeting the A standard can enter one competitor of each sex (known as the basic quota) in only 10 km classical event for women or 15 km classical event for men. They must have a maximum of 300 FIS distance points at the end of qualifying on January 20, 2014. The qualification period began in July 2012.

Results
The race was started at 14:00.

References

Women's cross-country skiing at the 2014 Winter Olympics
Women's 10 kilometre cross-country skiing at the Winter Olympics